Ain't Crying for the Moon is the tenth studio album by rock band Kingdom Come.

Track listing
All songs by Lenny Wolf, except where noted.
 "Two Legged Sheep" - 5:28
 "Not Here to Be Your Friend" - 3:50
 "Same Old Stars" - 3:28
 "Ain't Crying for the Moon" - 8:34
 "Perfect Citizen" - 5:34
 "This Is My Life" - 4:15
 "Bon Scott" - 4:13
 "Remove the Sting" - 5:49
 "Friends In Spirit" - 5:35
 "Darkroom" - 3:47
 "Look at You" - 3:53
 "Across the Universe" (John Lennon, Paul McCartney) - 3:58
 "Get It On" (Lenny Wolf, Marty Wolff) - 4:22

Personnel 
Lenny Wolf – lead vocals and all instruments
Eric Förster – guitar solos
Hehdrik Thiesbrummel – piano

Produced by Lenny Wolf

References

Kingdom Come (band) albums
2006 albums